Culture Club are  an English pop band formed in London in 1981. The band comprises Boy George (lead vocals), Roy Hay (guitar and keyboards), and Mikey Craig (bass guitar), and formerly included Jon Moss (drums and percussion). Emerging in the New Romantic scene, they are considered one of the most representative and influential groups of the 1980s.

Led by singer and frontman Boy George, whose androgynous style of dressing caught the attention of the public and the media in the early 1980s, the band have sold more than 50 million records, including over 6 million BPI certified records sold in the UK and over 7 million RIAA certified records sold in the US. Their hits include "Do You Really Want to Hurt Me", "Time (Clock of the Heart)", "I'll Tumble 4 Ya", "Church of the Poison Mind", "Karma Chameleon", "Victims", "Miss Me Blind", "It's a Miracle", "The War Song", "Move Away", and "I Just Wanna Be Loved". In the UK they amassed twelve Top 40 hit singles between 1982 and 1999, including the number ones "Do You Really Want To Hurt Me" and "Karma Chameleon", the latter being the biggest selling single of 1983 in the UK, and hit number one on the US Hot 100 in 1984. The song "Time (Clock of the Heart)" is included on the Rock and Roll Hall of Fame's list of 500 songs that shaped rock and roll.

Their second album, Colour by Numbers, sold more than 10 million copies worldwide. It appeared on Rolling Stone magazine's list of the 100 Best Albums of the 1980s and is also included in the book 1001 Albums You Must Hear Before You Die. Ten of their singles reached the US Top 40, where they are associated with the Second British Invasion of British new wave groups that became popular in the US due to the cable music channel MTV. Culture Club's music combines British new wave and American soul and pop. It also includes some elements of Jamaican reggae and also other styles such as calypso, salsa, and with "Karma Chameleon", elements of country music.

Culture Club have sold more than 50 million records worldwide, including 7 million records in the United States. In 1984, Culture Club won Brit Awards for Best British Group, Best British Single ("Karma Chameleon"), and the Grammy Award for Best New Artist. They were nominated the same year for the Grammy Award for Pop Vocal by Group or Duo. The band were also nominated for a Canadian Juno Award for International Album of the Year. In January 1985, Culture Club were nominated for an American Music Award for Favorite Pop/Rock Band/Duo/Group Video Artist, and in September 1985, they were nominated for two MTV Video Music Awards for Best Special Effects and Best Art Direction for their video "It's a Miracle". In 1987, they received another nomination for an American Music Award for Favorite Pop/Rock Band/Duo/Group Video Artist.

History

1981–1983: Formation and Kissing to Be Clever 

In 1981, Blitz Club regular Boy George occasionally sang with the group Bow Wow Wow, performing under the stage name Lieutenant Lush with the group. After his tenure with the group ended, George decided to start his own band and enlisted bassist Mikey Craig, drummer Jon Moss (formerly of The Damned and Adam and the Ants), and finally guitarist Roy Hay joined the group. The band originally called themselves Sex Gang Children, which would quickly be abandoned and adopted by another band. 

Realizing they had an Irish gay man as the lead singer, a black Briton on bass, a blond Englishman on guitar and keyboards, and a Jewish drummer, they eventually decided to name the group Culture Club. The group recorded demos, which were paid for by EMI Records, but the label was unimpressed and decided not to sign the group. Virgin Records heard the demos and signed the group in the UK, releasing their albums in Europe, while Epic Records released their albums in the United States and much of the rest of the world.

The band released two singles in May and June 1982, "White Boy" and "I'm Afraid of Me", though both failed to chart. In September of that year, the group released their third single, "Do You Really Want to Hurt Me", a reggae-influenced number, which became one of their biggest hits. The song went to No. 1 in the UK in late 1982 and became an international smash, topping the charts in twenty-three countries (No. 2 in the US), and the top ten in several more countries.

The band's 1982 debut on Top of the Pops created tabloid headlines, which focused on George's androgynous style of dress and sexual ambiguity. Magazines began to feature George prominently on their covers. Pete Burns, lead singer of the new wave band Dead or Alive, would later claim he was the first to wear braids, big hats, and colourful costumes, but George would cut back with a sharp-tongued remark, "It's not who did it first, it's who did it better."

The band's debut album, Kissing to Be Clever (UK No. 5, US No. 14) was released in October 1982, and the follow-up single, "Time (Clock of the Heart)", became another Top 10 hit in the US (Number 2) and UK (Number 3). "I'll Tumble 4 Ya" also became a Top Ten hit in the US (Number 9) and in Canada. This gave Culture Club the distinction of being the first group since The Beatles to have three Top Ten hits in America from a debut album. Kissing to Be Clever sold over 1.5 million copies in the US, being certified platinum.

1983–1984: Colour by Numbers 

The band's second album, Colour by Numbers (UK No. 1, US No. 2), was released in 1983. The first single, "Church of the Poison Mind", featuring backing vocalist Helen Terry, reached the UK and US Top 10. The second single, "Karma Chameleon", gave the band their biggest hit, peaking at No. 1 in the UK (the band's second chart-topper there), where it became the best-selling single of 1983 and has sold 1.5 million copies there to date. It also peaked at No. 1 in the US for three consecutive weeks, and would ultimately hit No. 1 in 30 countries, thus becoming one of the top twenty best-selling singles of the 1980s sold up seven million copies worldwide, with one of the most iconic images of Boy George on the cover shot by photographer David Levine.

The album Colour by Numbers would spawn more hits including "Miss Me Blind" (#5 US), "It's a Miracle" (#4 UK, No. 13 US), and "Victims" (#3 UK), and sold four million copies in the US and another five million worldwide at its time of release. The album gave Culture Club the distinction of being the first group in music history to have an album certified diamond in Canada (for sales of one million copies in that country). The band also won the 1984 Brit Award for Best Group and the Grammy Award for Best New Artist, where George gave a speech via satellite stating, "Thanks America, you've got style, you've got taste, and you know a good drag queen when you see one."

The group's back-up singer, Helen Terry, began work on her solo album, for which George and Hay wrote the song "Love Lies Lost". The pair also wrote "Passing Friend" for the Beach Boys' album. Culture Club wrote two songs for the soundtrack to the movie Electric Dreams. George and Hay wrote "The Dream" and "Love Is Love", with the latter being released as a single in Canada, Japan and South America, the E.P "Love is Love" became a major hit in Brazil. George also collaborated on the song "Electric Dreams", sung by P. P. Arnold. The song was written with Phil Pickett (former member of the 1970s band Sailor) who had also co-written "Karma Chameleon" and frequently played keyboards for the group.

Despite Culture Club's commercial success, there were significant pressures within the band. George was using drugs with money from his new-found fame. George and Moss were also romantically involved with each other, which was unknown to the public and the media at the time. Their relationship lasted for over four years and was often turbulent, with alleged physical and verbal abuse from both sides. Their constant arguments and the pressure to hide the relationship from the public started to take its toll on the band.

1984–1986: Waking Up with the House on Fire, From Luxury to Heartache and decline 

In 1984, the group released their third album Waking Up with the House on Fire (UK No. 2, US No. 26) which sold 2.8 million copies worldwide. Although certified platinum in both the UK and the US, it was a commercial and critical disappointment compared to their first two albums. The album contained the hit single "The War Song", which reached No. 2 in the UK, and Top 20 in the US. Other singles like "Mistake No. 3" (US No. 33) and "The Medal Song" (UK No. 32) would become modest hits. George later stated he felt the album experienced a lukewarm reception because of half-hearted material he felt they released due to pressure from Virgin and Epic. According to him, the band had just come off an exhausting world tour in 1984.

At the end of 1984, Boy George was recruited by Bob Geldof to join the Band Aid recording, consisting of mostly internationally known UK and Irish recording stars. George was in New York City for an appearance on Late Night with David Letterman when Geldof called him, but managed to catch the final Concorde of the day to London and was the last singer to record a lead vocal track for the song "Do They Know It's Christmas?". The song would become the biggest selling single of all-time in the UK and a huge international hit, raising millions for famine victims in several African nations, particularly Ethiopia.

Due to all the heartache from the break-up of his relationship with Moss, and all the ensuing tension with rest of the band, George turned to relief in drugs. Consequently, he soon developed a self-destructive drug addiction, which in merely four months escalated from marijuana to heroin. By 1986, George had become seriously addicted. The recording of their fourth studio album, 1986's From Luxury to Heartache (UK No. 10, US No. 32) dragged on for so long that producer Arif Mardin had to abandon the sessions due to prior commitments and leave it to engineer Lew Hahn to finish the sessions. Nevertheless, the first single "Move Away" became a hit, peaking at UK No. 7 and US No. 12 and appeared the album would return the group back to its previous success. But by the time of the release of the second single "God Thank You Woman", news of George's drug addiction began to circulate in British and American tabloids, and the second single stalled on its way up the charts, failing to make a big impact.

George and Moss also no longer wanted to be around each other due to the constant relationship battles and with George's addiction. From Luxury to Heartache began to fade from the charts as well, and the album ultimately sold fewer than one million copies worldwide at the time of release. By the summer of 1986, George finally admitted that he was indeed addicted to drugs. In July of that year, he was arrested by the British police for possession of heroin. The band broke up and George pursued a solo career, having several European hits and a couple of US Top 40 hits.

Reunions

1989 

The band first tried to reunite in 1989, after many requests from Tony Gordon, the group's former manager and George's manager at that time. George agreed to try some songs with the band again, resulting in recording sessions and producing more than a dozen songs that remain unreleased. George, however, was more excited about his future projects like his record label, More Protein, and his new acid house project Jesus Loves You. The proposed reunion ended up being cancelled.

1998–2000, 2002 

In 1998, George and Moss put their differences aside and the band reunited to do a reunion tour, kicking off with a performance on VH1 Storytellers. George said about the reunion, "Culture Club's reunion couldn't have come at a better time for rock", adding that, "It's a nostalgia trip, there's no way of avoiding that." The tour was a major success. Greatest Moments, a compilation album based around the Storytellers performance, was released, and went platinum in UK. It included new songs such as "I Just Wanna Be Loved", which hit UK No. 4. However, their new-found success was short-lived and their fifth studio album, Don't Mind If I Do, released in 1999, peaked at No. 64 in the UK. It included minor UK hits in "Your Kisses Are Charity" (UK No. 25) and "Cold Shoulder" (UK No. 43).

The band went on to tour, then reunited again for a 20th anniversary concert in 2002 at the Royal Albert Hall in London. This performance was released on DVD the following year. Culture Club then became inactive again, largely due to George's successful DJ career, as well as his semi-autobiographical musical Taboo. It was a success in London, but was a flop on Broadway, only running for 100 performances, as well as losing $10 million for its producer, Rosie O'Donnell.

2006 

In 2006, original members Craig and Moss tried to launch a new tour with another lead singer, as George and Hay had declined to tour. Early that year, the band's record company placed an ad for a lead singer to "...take part in a 2007 World Tour and TV Series." The new singer, Sam Butcher was selected because of his own personality, "not a Boy George lookalike." After watching a video on MySpace, George described the singer who replaced him as "terrible" and "dreadful". George said: "I wanted to like it but I couldn't. They're my songs, they're my heart, they're my life." A proposed tour for December 2006 in the UK did not take place.

2011 

In late 2011, George was part of a three-man Culture Club band that performed two live concerts, in Dubai and Sydney, the latter being a New Year's Eve concert, although Moss did not appear due to a back injury. However, the band weren't able to tour in the US, due to George being denied a visa 3 years prior.

2014–present 

In 2014, the band reformed and announced a tour and a new album. A new picture of the four members was also posted on the band's official website, along with the list of the 11 UK concert dates.

The band travelled to Spain for a two-week recording session. 18 new tracks were completed for a new album produced by Youth. The new album, entitled Tribes, was scheduled for release in early 2015 on the band's own label Different Man Music (via Kobalt Label Services). At the end of that year the album had still not materialised.

On 19 July 2014, the band were among the line-up for a two-hour concert in Edinburgh Castle, ahead of the opening ceremony of the Commonwealth Games in Glasgow. Hay did not perform with the band because he was in recovery after having knee surgery. The band played two songs, "Do You Really Want To Hurt Me" and "Karma Chameleon" which were shown on BBC TV.

In mid-November 2014, two days before the start of their 21-date US and UK tour, Culture Club announced they had to cancel the tour due to George suffering from a serious throat condition. The cancelled tour would have represented the full original line-up's first tour in 12 years. The North American tour was eventually rescheduled and started on 17 July 2015 in Canada. A television documentary, Boy George and Culture Club: Karma to Calamity, aired on BBC Four on 6 March 2015. The programme documented the band's reunion in 2014 and the making of their new album in Spain, up to the announcement to cancel the tour. Based on the popularity of 2015's mini-tour, Culture Club began a 40-city summer tour in 2016. The major success of this tour culminated in a DVD/CD/Blu-ray release, Live At Wembley: World Tour 2016.

In August 2016, the band announced that the album Tribes was permanently shelved, and offered refunds to all those who had pre-ordered the album online.

In 2018, Culture Club toured the US and Europe from June to December. Dubbed The Life Tour, the band toured in support of their namesake album, along with supporting acts The B-52s, Tom Bailey (formerly of The Thompson Twins) and Belinda Carlisle (Europe dates only). Jon Moss was originally part of the line-up, but did not participate in the European leg of the tour. A spokeswoman for Boy George confirmed: "Jon's taking a break from Culture Club but the door is open in the future." In December 2019, Moss filed a writ at London's High Court naming the band trio as defendants. Moss' lawyers say he was told to "take a break" by manager Paul Kemsley, demanding nearly £200,000 in missing payments and a share of profits. Jon Moss officially left Culture Club in May 2021.

Culture Club returned to the SSE Arena in Wembley on 19 December 2020 for a livestream concert broadcast around the world, in response to the ongoing COVID-19 pandemic. Titled Rainbow in the Dark, the concert saw the band play their classic hits, new material, including a new ballad version of "Karma Chameleon", featuring Mila, and covers of T. Rex's "Get It On (Bang a Gong)" and George's solo cover of Bread's "Everything I Own".

Awards and achievements

ASCAP Pop Music Awards

|-
| rowspan="2"|1984
| "Karma Chameleon"
| rowspan="2"|Most Performed Songs
| 
|-
| "It's a Miracle"
|

American Music Awards

|-
| 1985
| rowspan="2" | Culture Club
| rowspan="2" | Favorite Pop/Rock Band/Duo/Group
| 
|-
| 1987
|

American Video Awards

|-
| rowspan=4|1984
| rowspan=2|A Kiss Across the Ocean
| Best Long-Form Video
| 
|-
| Best Home Video
| 
|-
| "The War Song"
| Best Choreography
| 
|-
| "Miss Me Blind"
| Best Set Design 
|

Billboard Music Awards

|-
| rowspan=6|1983
| rowspan=4|Themselves
| Top Pop New Artist
| 
|-
| Top Pop Singles Artist
| 
|-
| Top Pop Singles Artist – Duo/Group
| 
|-
| Top Adult Contemporary Artist – Duo/Group
| 
|-
| Kissing to Be Clever
| Top Pop Album
| 
|-
| "Karma Chameleon"
| Top UK Single
|

BRIT Awards

|-
| 1983
| rowspan="2"|Culture Club
| Best British Breakthrough Act
| 
|-
| rowspan="2" | 1984
| Best British Group 
| 
|-
| "Karma Chameleon"
| Best British Single
|

Classic Pop Reader Awards

|-
| 2019
| Culture Club
| Artist of the Year
|

Creem Magazine Awards

|-
| rowspan=2|1983
| Themselves
| Worst Group – No. 1
| 
|-
| Colour by Numbers
| Top Album – No. 19
|

Goldene Europa 

|-
| 1983
| Colour by Numbers
| Best International Group 
|

Grammy Awards

|-
| rowspan="2" | 1984
| Culture Club
| Best New Artist
| 
|-
| "Do You Really Want to Hurt Me"
| Best Pop Performance by a Duo or Group
|

Ivor Novello Awards

 
|-
| 1983
| "Do You Really Want to Hurt Me"
| Bestselling A-Side
|  
|-
| rowspan="4" | 1984
| rowspan="4" | "Karma Chameleon"
| Best Pop Song
|  
|-
| Bestselling A-Side
|  
|-
| Most Performed Work
|  
|-
| International Hit of the Year
|

Juno Awards

|-
| 1984
| Colour by Numbers
| International Album of the Year
|

MTV Video Music Awards

|-
| rowspan=2|1985
| rowspan=2|"It's a Miracle"
| Best Special Effects
| 
|-
| Best Art Direction
|

Q Awards

|-
| 2006
| "Karma Chameleon"
| Q Classic Song Award
|  
|-
| 2014
| Culture Club 
| Q Idol
|

Rockbjörnen

|-
| 1983
| Colour by Numbers
| Best Foreign Album
|

Smash Hits Poll Winners Party

|-
| rowspan=4|1982
| "Do You Really Want to Hurt Me?"
| Best Single
| 
|-
| Kissing to Be Clever
| Best Album
| 
|-
| rowspan=3|Themselves 
| Most Promising New Act 
| 
|-
| rowspan=2|Best Group
| 
|-
| rowspan=6|1983
| 
|-
| Culture Club's "Colour by Numbers" Tour
| rowspan=2|Event of the Year
| 
|-
| Culture Club Making No.1 with "Karma Chameleon"| 
|-
| rowspan=2|"Karma Chameleon"
| Best Single
| 
|-
| Best Video
| 
|-
| Colour by Numbers| rowspan=2|Best Album
| 
|-
| rowspan=4|1984
| Waking Up with the House on Fire| 
|-
| rowspan=2|"The War Song"
| Best Single
| 
|-
| Best Video
| 
|-
| rowspan=2|Themselves
| Best Group
| 
|-
| 1985
| Worst Group
| 

Rock and Roll Hall of Fame

|-
| 1999
| "Time (Clock of the Heart)"
| 500 Songs That Shaped Rock and Roll
| 
| No. 107

Variety Club of Great Britain Awards 

|-
| 1985
| The War Song| Best Recording Artist 
| 

 Musical style and development 

Culture Club's sound combines British new wave and American soul with Jamaican reggae and also other styles as calypso, salsa or country.Philadelphia Daily News described Culture Club as a hot new rock act, while William K Knoedelseder Jr from Los Angeles Times said about the group, "Boy George of Culture Club, a rock group MTV helped make popular", adding that, "There's some debate in the record industry about MTV's ability to directly increase record sales across the board but there's no doubt that the channel has been responsible for exposing such rock artists as Def Leppard, Duran Duran and Men at Work to a national audience..."

In the 1980s, Boy George said about the music style of his band Culture Club, "We play rock 'n' roll and I love rock 'n' roll music but I don't like the lifestyle. I don't like people tipping beer over their heads.... I just hate rock 'n' roll in that way. It's disgusting and boring. I look at what we're doing as very intelligent."

Stephen Holden, music critic for The New York Times, said in his article Rock: British Culture Club, that "Culture Club blends soul, rock, funk, reggae and salsa into a music that programmatically reconciles white, black and Latin styles", adding that, "Mr. O'Dowd made the group's best songs – the Motown-flavoured Do You Really Want to Hurt Me and the Latin-inflected dance tune I'll Tumble 4 Ya – shine like jewels."

Star-News considered Culture Club as a 'new rock' band of the 1980s; the newspaper said "Now you see the more rhythm-oriented, 'new rock of the 80s,' like Culture Club and the Eurythmics, fitting in more easily with urban contemporary formats."

Stephen Thomas Erlewine, senior editor for AllMusic, described specifically Culture Club as a new wave band and generically as the most successful pop/rock group in America and England during the 1980s, adding that, "By 1986, the group had broken up, leaving behind several singles that rank as classics of the new wave era."

The music of Culture Club is described by George as, "The aim is to be creatively fluid to make everything we do a little different. We want to be a bridge between white rock and black soul", adding that, "I want Culture Club to represent all peoples and minorities".

The band was part of the second British rock invasion of the 1980s in the United States, as R. Serge Denisoff and William L. Schurk said in their book Tarnished gold: the record industry revisited, "Here comes the rock and roll of 1984. The invaders were a mixed bunch led by Culture Club, whose sound has been described as 'recycled Smokey Robinson' or 'torchy American schmaltz and classic Motown'", adding that, "Boy George's drag-queen appearance made the group a natural for the visual demands of cable television".

In her book Magazines for children: a guide for parents, teachers, and librarians, author Selma K. Richardson said that Culture Club's music is soft rock that contains, "enough soul and new wave elements to cover almost all audiences".

 Band members 

Principal members
 Boy George (George O'Dowd) – vocals, tambourine (1981–1986, 1998–2002, 2011–present)
 Mikey Craig – vocals, bass, keyboards (1981–1986, 1998–2002, 2011–present)
 Roy Hay – guitars, vocals, keyboards (1981–1986, 1998–2002, 2011–present)

Touring/session members
 Darren Lewis – keyboards, percussion (2011–present)
 Meryl-Anne Evanson – drums, percussion, vocals (2021–present)

Former members
 Phil Pickett – keyboards, vocals (1981–1986) (touring)
 Darius Zickus – keyboards (1998–2002) (touring)
 Jon Moss – drums, percussion, vocals (1981–1986, 1998–2002, 2011–2021) (main)
 Sam Butcher – vocals (2006) (touring)

 Discography 

 Kissing to Be Clever (1982)
 Colour by Numbers (1983)
 Waking Up with the House on Fire (1984)
 From Luxury to Heartache (1986)
 Don't Mind If I Do (1999)
 Life (2018)

 Citations 

 Bibliography 

 
 
 
 
 
 
 
 
 

 Songbooks 

 Kissing to Be Clever (including "Time (Clock of the Heart)" – 1982), London & Suffolk, West Central Printing Co. Ltd., distr. Music Sales Ltd.
 Colour by Numbers (1983), London & Suffolk, West Central Printing Co. Ltd., distr. Music Sales Ltd.
 Waking Up with the House on Fire (1984), London & Suffolk, West Central Printing Co. Ltd., distr. Music Sales Ltd.
 From Luxury to Heartache (1986), Virgin Music (Publishers) Ltd., distr. IMP-International Music Publications, Essex, England
 Culture Club'' (10 of their best songs – 1987), Virgin Music (Publishers) Ltd., distr. IMP-International Music Publications, Essex, England
N.B.: Each of the first four songbooks includes a detailed official biography, which is each time updated: this way, such songbooks, corresponding to the band's first four albums, chronicle the early official biography of Culture Club, from 1982 to 1986.

External links 

 
 
 Culture Club VH1 artist page 
 Culture Club MTV artist page
 [ Culture Club Billboard artist page]
 Culture Club Rolling Stone artist page

 
Brit Award winners
English dance music groups
English pop music groups
English new wave musical groups
Epic Records artists
British musical trios
Grammy Award winners
LGBT-themed musical groups
Musical groups disestablished in 1986
Musical groups disestablished in 2002
Musical groups established in 1981
Musical groups reestablished in 1998
Musical groups reestablished in 2011
Musical quartets
Virgin Records artists
British soul musical groups
1981 establishments in England
Second British Invasion artists